Yopps Meeting House, also known as Yopps Primitive Baptist Church, is a historic Primitive Baptist church located at Sneads Ferry, Onslow County, North Carolina. The current building was built around 1890, however the Friends of Yopp's Meeting House organization claims there may have been a log precursor built as early as 1813.  The meeting house is a one-story, rectangular, frame building with a steep, gable-front roof and Greek Revival style design elements.  Also on the property are two contributing cemeteries, one for white and one for African-American parishioners.  Some of the plots are surrounded by iron fencing.

It was listed on the National Register of Historic Places in 1999.

References

Baptist churches in North Carolina
Churches on the National Register of Historic Places in North Carolina
1890s architecture in the United States
Greek Revival church buildings in North Carolina
Religious buildings and structures completed in 1890
Buildings and structures in Onslow County, North Carolina
National Register of Historic Places in Onslow County, North Carolina
Wooden churches in North Carolina